The 2019 FC Dallas season was the club's 24th season in Major League Soccer, the top tier of American soccer. FC Dallas also participated in the U.S. Open Cup.

Background

Transfers

In 

|}

Draft picks

Out

Club

Roster 
As of August 9, 2019.

Out on loan

Competitions

Preseason 
Kickoff times are in CST (UTC−06) unless shown otherwise

Mid-season exhibitions 
Kickoff times are in CDT (UTC−05) unless shown otherwise

MLS

Western Conference standings 
Western Conference

Overall standings

Results summary

Results by round

Regular season 
Kickoff times are in CDT (UTC−05) unless shown otherwise

MLS Cup Playoffs

U.S. Open Cup

Statistics

Appearances 
Numbers outside parentheses denote appearances as starter.
Numbers in parentheses denote appearances as substitute.
Players with no appearances are not included in the list.

 Goals and assists 

Player name(s) in italics transferred out mid-season.

 Disciplinary record 

Player name(s) in italics'' transferred out mid-season.

Goalkeeper stats

Kits

See also 
 FC Dallas
 2019 in American soccer
 2019 Major League Soccer season

References

Dallas, FC
Dallas, FC
Dallas, FC
FC Dallas seasons